Vartika Brij Nath Singh is an Indian model and beauty pageant titleholder who was appointed as Miss Universe India 2019 and represented India at 68th edition of the Miss Universe pageant. She was previously crowned as Femina Miss India Femina Miss India Grand International in 2015. The GQ magazine had ranked her among the hottest women of India in 2017.

Early life and education
Singh was born on 27 August 1993 in Lucknow, Uttar Pradesh. She was educated at the Canossa Convent School in Lucknow. She received her bachelor's degree in Clinical nutrition and dietetics from Isabella Thoburn College. She holds a master's degree in Public health from the University of Lucknow.

Career and pageantry

Singh competed at the Miss Diva 2014 pageant, where she placed in the top 7. She also won the 'Miss Photogenic' award at the contest. In 2015, she competed at the 52nd edition of the Femina Miss India pageant and was crowned Femina Miss Grand India 2015.
 
Singh represented India at Miss Grand International 2015 in Bangkok, Thailand and won the 2nd runner-up title. Four years after the pageant was held, the original winner was dethroned and the first runner-up from Australia assumed the title; the new winner was later dethroned too by the pageant making India the assumed winner of Miss Grand 2015. She also won the 'Best Social Media' award and placed in the Top 10 of Miss Popular Vote and Top 20 in Best National Costume sub-contests. Her finale gown was designed by Shane and Falguni Peacock and her national costume was designed by Malvika Tater.

In 2016, her interview and the photoshoot was published in the January edition of the GQ (India) magazine. The magazine also ranked her among the hottest women of India in 2016. She competed in the Kingfisher Model Hunt contest in 2017 and was featured on the Kingfisher bikini calendar's March and October pages.

She has contributed as a technical adviser to a health-based government project in association with the World Bank. In 2018, Vartika Singh founded a non-profit organization called 'Pure Humans'. As a Public health professional, she aims to create and spread awareness about Public health-related issues in the country. Vartika has been working with the Government of Uttar Pradesh to create awareness and educate the communities about Tuberculosis. She has also been working with the Smile Train Organization in India as a Goodwill Ambassador, to provide aid and treatment to children born with cleft lip and cleft palate.

On 26 September 2019, Vartika was appointed as Miss Universe India 2019, since there was no Miss Diva pageant conducted in 2019. She represented India at the Miss Universe 2019 pageant held in Atlanta, Georgia on 8 December 2019, and placed in the Top 20. She ended India's consecutive unplacement streak at Miss Universe.

Music Videos

References

External links

Indian beauty pageant winners
Female models from Uttar Pradesh
Femina Miss India winners
1991 births
Living people
University of Lucknow alumni
Beauty pageant contestants from India
Miss Universe 2019 contestants
Miss Grand International contestants